Grass Pond is a small lake north-northeast of Minnehaha in Herkimer County, New York. It drains southwest via an unnamed creek which flows into Cedar Pond.

See also
 List of lakes in New York

References 

Lakes of New York (state)
Lakes of Herkimer County, New York